Canet Roussillon may refer to:

 Canet-en-Roussillon, commune in Occitanie, France
 Canet Roussillon FC, association football club in Canet-en-Roussillon, Occitanie, France